Tormás is a village in Hegyhát District, northern Baranya county, in the Southern Transdanubia region of Hungary. Its population at the 2011 census was 301.

Geography 
It is part of the Southern Transdanubia statistical region, and administratively it falls under Baranya County and then Hegyhát District.

Demographics

2011 census 
As of the census of 2011, there were 301 residents, 110 households, and 78 families living in the village. The average household size was 2.71. The average number of children was 1.29. The average family size was 3.13.

Religious affiliation was 75.8% Roman Catholic, 3.7% Calvinist, 0.3% other religion, and 7.4% unaffiliated, with 12.8% declining to answer.

The village had significant ethnic minority Roma (22.1%) and German (17.4%) populations. A small number of residents also identified as Romanian (0.3%). All residents identified as Hungarian.

Local government 
The village is governed by a mayor with a four-person council. The local government of the village operates a joint council office with the nearby localities of Bakóca, Baranyajenő, Kisbeszterce, Kishajmás, Mindszentgodisa, and Szágy. The seat of the joint council is in Mindszentgodisa.

As of the election of 2019, the village also has local minority self-governments for its Roma and German communities, each with three elected representatives.

Transportation

Railway 
 Sásd Train Station,  to the northeast of the village. The station is on the Pusztaszabolcs–Pécs and Dombóvár-Komló railway lines and is operated by MÁV.

Notes

External links 
 OpenStreetMap
 Detailed Gazetteer of Hungary

References

Populated places in Baranya County